USS Menominee (AT-73) was a  constructed for the United States Navy during World War II. Her purpose was to aid ships, usually by towing, on the high seas or in combat or post-combat areas, plus "other duties as assigned." During World War II she was assigned to the Asiatic-Pacific Theater where she participated in four campaigns earning four battle stars.

Description
Menominee was laid down 27 September 1941, at United Engineering Co. in San Francisco and launched on 14 February 1942. She was commissioned 25 September 1942.

Decommission and sale
After the war, Menominee sailed for home. In Portland on 15 November 1946, she was decommissioned and entered the Pacific Reserve Fleet. She was struck from the Naval Register 1 November 1959, and transferred to Indonesia on 26 January 1961 as part of the Military Assistance Program. She served in Indonesia as Rakata (928). While in Indonesian service, the Oerlikon 20 mm cannons located in bridge wings were replaced with 2M-3 twin 25 mm cannons of Soviet origin. In the 1980s, her pennant number were changed to 922. As of 2004, the ship was mostly used as patrol ship.

References

External links 
 
 KRI Rakata 922: Tugboat with a Long History Track (in Indonesian)

 

Cherokee-class fleet tugs
World War II auxiliary ships of the United States
Tugboats of the Indonesian Navy
Ships built in San Francisco
1942 ships
Ships transferred from the United States Navy to the Indonesian Navy